Silvia Benoit is a former Swiss curler.

Teams

References

External links
 

Living people

Swiss female curlers
European curling champions

Year of birth missing (living people)
20th-century Swiss women